Chacra is a census-designated place (CDP) in and governed by Garfield County, Colorado, United States. The CDP is a part of the Glenwood Springs, CO Micropolitan Statistical Area. The population of the Chacra CDP was 329 at the United States Census 2010. The Glenwood Springs post office (Zip Code 81601) serves the area.

Geography
Interstate 70 passes through the community, with access from Exit 109.

Demographics

See also

 List of census-designated places in Colorado

References

External links

 Garfield County website

Census-designated places in Garfield County, Colorado
Census-designated places in Colorado